Exeter School is a private co-educational day school for pupils between the ages of 7 and 18 in Exeter, Devon, England. In 2019, there were around 200 pupils in the Junior School and 700 in the Senior School.

History

The School traces its origins from the opening of the Exeter Free Grammar School on 1 August 1633, attended mainly by the sons of the City freemen.  Exeter's wealthy merchants, notably Thomas Walker, provided the finance, with sufficient bequests to pay the Headmaster £50 a year and to install the school in the medieval buildings of St John's Hospital, which had stood on the south side of the High Street since the 12th century.

In 1878, the school opened as Exeter Grammar School at a new campus designed by noted architect William Butterfield. The school occupies this  site on Victoria Park Road to this day. The cost at the time was £7,600 with a further £16,750 spent on the erection of buildings.  It was decided that St John's Hospital Trust had to pay to Exeter School the net annual income of all endowments for Exhibitions and Scholarships attached to the School, and it also had to pay a proportion of the residue of its income.

In 1920, the Governors of Exeter School decided that it was no longer possible for the school to continue without considerable assistance.  The Exeter Education Authority agreed to assist but only if the school came under its direct control so, in April 1921, control of the school was handed over to the City.  It then became a "maintained" school until 1929 when it became an "aided" school, thus regaining charge of its own finances under a newly appointed Governing Body.

In March 1945, the status of the school changed again, becoming a direct grant grammar school, and it remained as such until September 1975 when the scheme was abolished.  In September 1976, the first "private" pupils were admitted to the school.

From 1979, the School participated in the Assisted Places Scheme, taking over 200 pupils at its peak, but the scheme was abolished by the government in 1997 and the last of those pupils left in the summer of 2004. In 1981, the Sixth Form became coeducational. Following the success of the move, girls were admitted to all years in 1997.

The school maintains links with its former pupils through the Old Exonian Club which meets annually around the country. There is an Alumni Office which opened in September 2013. It was set up to develop and foster lifelong relationships between the School and its past pupils and staff.

Academic standards
In March 2014, the Independent Schools Inspectorate reported upon eight areas: the quality of the pupils' achievements and learning; the contribution of curricular and extra-curricular provision; the contribution of teaching; the spiritual, moral, social and cultural development of pupils; the contribution of arrangements for pastoral care; the contribution of arrangements for welfare, health and safety; the quality of governance; and the quality of leadership and management, including links with parents, carers and guardians.

The report concluded that the 7-18 co-educational day school was at the highest level, excellent, in each of the eight areas.

The team of nine reported that "the quality of the pupils' achievements is excellent in their academic work and their activities." The ISI report continues: "Teaching is excellent and promotes high quality learning. The broad curriculum enables pupils to have a wide range of experiences and the extra -curricular provision is extensive. Pupils achieve individual and team successes in a wide range of activities and national competitions. Pupils have an excellent attitude to their work and this makes a significant contribution to their achievement and progress."

The report also commented on the excellent relationships between staff and pupils where learning is seen as a co-operative venture. "Teachers have high expectations of their pupils and pupils feel well supported by staff who offer much help and encouragement beyond the classroom with drop in sessions, academic clubs, work on the intranet and individual support."

In the summer of 2019, Exeter School celebrated another set of very good A Level results with a 100% pass rate. 21% of all grades were A*, four times the national average, and 54% of grades were either A* or A, more than double the national average of 25.2%. 81% of all grades were A*, A or B.
 
Summer 2019's GCSE results were also excellent; 74% were 9-7 grades, over three times the national average. Of the 118 pupils in Year 11, 67 achieved 8 or more 9-7 grades with 37 pupils scoring ten or more 9-7 grades.

In December 2017, The Sunday Times named Exeter School ‘South-West Independent Secondary School of the Year 2018’. The 25th edition of its annual Schools Guide, Parent Power, awarded the top place to the co-educational independent school, based on its outstanding academic achievements and overall educational provision.

Houses
There are 10 houses:
Acland
Buller
Collins
Crossing
Daw
Dowrich
Drake
Goff
Raleigh
Townsend

Whilst this allocation is primarily for pastoral care within the school it also allows an Inter House sports programme to run throughout the year in a wide range of sports for pupils of all ages.

Fees
As of September 2019, the day fees are £4,175 per term for the Junior School (including lunch) and £4,675 per term for the senior school. In September 2016, Exeter School launched eight free places in the Senior School and Sixth Form, as a result of donations and legacies from former pupils, in addition to ongoing grants from a local charity.

Notable Old Exonians 

Michael Aron, British Ambassador to Kuwait, Iraq, Libya and Sudan
Martin J. Ball, Honorary Professor of Linguistics, Bangor University, Wales
J. P. V. D. Balsdon, historian
David Bellotti, Liberal Democrat politician and CEO of Brighton & Hove Albion
John Blackall, physician
Kevin Brooks, author of young adult fiction
William Edward Buckley, professor of Anglo-Saxon 
Robin Bush, Time Team historian
David Collins, inaugural Governor of the Colony of Van Diemens Land (later Tasmania)
Paul Cosford, Director for Health Protection and Medical Director for Public Health England
Maurice O'Connor Drury, psychiatrist
Beattie Edmondson, actress and comedian 
Ella Edmondson, actress/folk singer/songwriter
General Sir Anthony Farrar-Hockley, soldier
Major General Charles Dair Farrar-Hockley, soldier
Matthew Goode, actor
Desmond Hamill, television journalist
Sir Ronald Hatton, pomologist
Matt Hopper, professional rugby union player
Fred T. Jane, founder of Jane's Information Group
Georgia King, actor
Alex Leger, Blue Peter producer and director
Tim Lewens historian and philosopher of biology and bioethics
Jack MacBryan test cricketer and Olympic gold medallist (hockey)
Stevie Morrison, Olympic Dinghy sailor.  Represented GB in Beijing and London Olympics sailing a 49er dinghy, with Ben Rhodes
George Ferris Whidborne Mortimer, English schoolmaster and divine
Ben Nealon, actor
Robert Newton, actor
Charles Arthur Turner, British jurist, Chief Justice of Madras High Court
Professor Ian Norman, King's College, London.
David M. Patrick International Organist.
Harry Pennell, commander of the Terra Nova Expedition and of HMS Queen Mary
Major Henry Rew, played rugby ten times for England.
Ben Rhodes, Olympic Dinghy sailor.  Represented GB in Beijing and London Olympics sailing a 49er dinghy, with Stevie Morrison
John Graves Simcoe, first Lieutenant-Governor of Ontario and founder of Toronto
Professor F. Gordon A. Stone, Chemistry Professor at the University of Bristol and at Baylor University
Harry Tincknell, Formula Three racing driver
Sir Harry Veitch, horticulturalist, instrumental in establishing the Chelsea Flower Show
Henry Vodden, Bishop of Hull
Harry Weslake, automotive engineer
Bob Wigley, Chairman Merrill Lynch, Europe, Middle East and Africa
Ian Williams, Racing yacht helmsman/skipper.  Four times winner of World Match Racing Tour.
George Woodbridge, actor, stage, screen and television

References

External links 
 Official site
 Old Exonian Club
 Profile on the ISC website

Educational institutions established in the 1630s
Private schools in Devon
1633 establishments in England
Member schools of the Headmasters' and Headmistresses' Conference
Schools in Exeter
William Butterfield buildings